is a 2018 Japanese television drama, starring Satomi Ishihara, Arata Iura, Masataka Kubota, Mikako Ichikawa and Yutaka Matsushige. It aired every Friday at 22:00 (JST) on TBS from January 12, 2018 to March 16, 2018.

It won Excellent Award at International Drama Festival in Tokyo, 96th Television Drama Academy Awards and others.

Plot 
Mikoto Misumi is a forensic doctor working at the Unnatural Death Investigation Laboratory (UDI Lab), a fictional facility recently established by the Ministry of Health, Labour and Welfare. Together with her colleagues, she solves cases involving deaths arising from unnatural circumstances.

Characters 
Mikoto Misumi
Starring: Satomi Ishihara
A 33 year old forensic doctor, who has accumulated experience of dissecting about 1500 bodies,  at the UDI Lab.

Kei Nakado
Starring: Arata Iura
A 41 year old forensic doctor, who has accumulated experience of dissecting about 3000 bodies,  at the UDI Lab.

Rokuro Kube
Starring: Masataka Kubota
A 26 year old recorder on Misumi's team.

Yuko Shoji
Starring: Mikako Ichikawa
A 35 year old technician on Misumi's team.

Yasuo Kamikura
Starring: Yutaka Matsushige
The 55 year old director of UDI Lab, and former high ranking official of Ministry of Health, Labour and Welfare.

Episodes

Accolades

References 

2018 Japanese television series debuts
2018 Japanese television series endings
Works by Akiko Nogi